The Kouns-Craft, described and registered as a Koun Aircraft Dirigible Helicopter was a patented experimental vehicle designed by Young Ho Koun. Koun was the first Chinese American to develop an aircraft in America.

Design and development
Koun, a cook by profession, developed the Aircraft Dirigible Helicopter to demonstrate an aircraft with vertical takeoff and landing capability. The vehicle was constructed over the course of five years.

The vehicle resembled a conventional light aircraft with the exception of two large airfoil-shaped cuffs over the wings intended to hold compressed helium. The designer felt that using compressed helium would provide additional buoyancy, requiring less volume than an unpressurized dirigible. Contemporary reports stated that the helium would only provide 10 pounds of lift. The exposed forward mounted engine was designed to tilt for forward or vertical thrust. A set of outrigger wheels on the wingtips were set for stability on the ground.

Operational history
The prototype was assembled at Roosevelt Field, New York in 1939. The CAA gave the aircraft a registration number, but not an experimental certificate. The sole flight attempt was performed in front of media. After many failed engine start attempts, the aircraft was started without the pilot and the vehicle was damaged while securing it. The aircraft was not publicly displayed again.

Specifications (Koun Aircraft Dirigible Helicopter)

References

1930s United States experimental aircraft
Single-engined tractor aircraft
VTOL aircraft
Low-wing aircraft